Camara may refer to:

 Camara (surname)
 Camara (social enterprise), an Irish social enterprise and charity
 Lato pros Kamara or Camara, an ancient city on Crete

See also 

 Kamara (disambiguation)
 Câmara (disambiguation)
 Camera (disambiguation)
 Camaro